The San Luis Rey Stakes is an American Thoroughbred horse race run annually at Santa Anita Park in Arcadia, California. Held during the third week of March, the Grade III event is open to horses of either gender, age four and up, willing to race one and one-half miles (12 furlongs) on the turf. The race normally begins on Santa Anita's downhill chute; from this position horses race down the hill and cross the dirt track before running one complete lap of the main turf course.
 
Prior to 1955, the race was restricted to California-foaled three-year-olds and in 1958 and 1959 to three-year-olds and up. It was contested on dirt at 7 furlongs in 1952, 6 furlongs in 1953, one mile in 1954, and at  miles in 1962. The race was transferred to the dirt track in 1975 and in 1989 was started on the backstretch instead of its normal position on the hillside. Two divisions were run in 1966, 1967, 1968 and 1970.

In its 66th running in 2013, Bright Thought won with a final time of 2:22.72, a world record time for  miles that stood for only one week; Twilight Eclipse lowered the standard at Gulfstream Park one week later.

Records
Speed  record: (at current distance of  miles)
 2:22.72 – Bright Thought (2013)

Most wins:

 2 – Cedar Key (1965, 1966)
 2 – Noble Dancer (1978, 1979)
 2 – John Henry (1980, 1981)
 2 – Bourbon Bay (2010, 2012)
 2 – Itsinthepost (2017,2018)

Most wins by a jockey:
 7 – Bill Shoemaker (1956, 1957, 1961, 1966, 1967 (2), 1970)

Most wins by a trainer:
 9 – Charlie Whittingham (1970, 1975, 1977, 1982, 1983, 1985, 1986, 1988, 1989)

Winners

References

External links
 The 2009 San Luis Rey Handicap at the NTRA

Horse races in California
Santa Anita Park
Graded stakes races in the United States
Open middle distance horse races
Flat horse races for four-year-olds
Turf races in the United States
Horse races established in 1952